A Hi is a tambon (subdistrict) of Tha Li District, in Loei Province, Thailand. In 2017 it had a population of 4,615 people.

Administration

Central administration
The tambon is divided into six administrative villages (mubans).

Local administration
The area of the subdistrict is covered by the subdistrict administrative organization (SAO) A Hi (องค์การบริหารส่วนตำบลอาฮี).

References

External links
Thaitambon.com on A Hi

Tambon of Loei Province